A44 may refer to :
 A44 road (Great Britain), a road connecting Oxford, England and Aberystwyth, Wales

 A44 motorway (Germany), a road connecting Aachen at the German–Belgian border and Kassel
 A44 motorway (Netherlands), a motorway in the Netherlands
 A44 motorway (Spain), a road connecting Bailén and until Ízbor
 A portion of the Great Western Highway in Sydney, Australia
 Benoni Defense, Encyclopaedia of Chess Openings code